Edward Breitung (November 10, 1831 – March 3, 1887) was a politician from the U.S. state of Michigan. He served one term in the United States House of Representatives from 1883 to 1885.

Early life and career
Breitung, the son of John M. Breitung, a Lutheran minister, was born in the city of Schalkau in the Duchy of Saxe-Meiningen, Germany (now in Sonneberg District, Thuringia). He attended the College of Mining in Meiningen, then one of the celebrated schools in Germany for scientific and classical studies.

In 1849, after the revolution in Germany, he immigrated to the United States and settled in Kalamazoo County, Michigan. He moved to Detroit in 1851 and became a clerk in a mercantile house. He moved to Marquette and engaged in mercantile pursuits until 1859, when he went to Negaunee.

He sold out his mercantile business to engage exclusively in iron-mining operations in 1864, explored for iron deposits in Marquette and Menominee Counties, locating several profitable mines from 1864 to 1867. He later became interested in gold and silver mining in Colorado.

Congress
Breitung was a member of the Michigan State House of Representatives in 1873 and 1874 and a member of the Michigan State Senate in 1877 and 1878. He served as mayor of Negaunee in 1879, 1880, and 1882. He was elected as a Republican to the United States House of Representatives from Michigan's 11th congressional district for the Forty-eighth Congress, serving from March 4, 1883 to March 3, 1885. He declined to be a candidate for renomination in 1884.

Death

Breitung died in Negaunee and is interred in Park Cemetery in Marquette. Breitung's son, Edward N. Breitung, continued his father's successful mining enterprises in the Upper Peninsula of Michigan.

Breitung Township, Minnesota is named after him for his work in developing the Soudan Mine there in the 1880s. Breitung Township, Michigan is also named for him.

References

External links
American biographical history of eminent and self-made men ... Michigan volume. Cincinnati, Western biographical publishing co., 1878.
Biographical record; this volume contains biographical sketches of leading citizens of Houghton, Baraga and Marquette Counties, Michigan ... Chicago, Biographical Publishing Co.,1903.

1831 births
1887 deaths
People from Negaunee, Michigan
People from Sonneberg (district)
Mayors of places in Michigan
Republican Party members of the Michigan House of Representatives
Republican Party Michigan state senators
Republican Party members of the United States House of Representatives from Michigan
German emigrants to the United States
19th-century American politicians